Nozir Hossain A politician in Sunamganj district of Sylhet Division of Bangladesh. He was elected the first Member of Parliament from the Communist Party of Bangladesh in Sunamganj-1 seat in the 1991 Jatiya Sangsad. He joined the Bangladesh Nationalist Party on 15 October 1993. Later, for the second time in February 1996 and for the third time on the 2001 the Bangladesh Nationalist Party was elected to the same seat.

Birth and early life 
Nozir Hossain was born in Sunamganj district.

Political life 
Nozir Hossain was once the leader of the Communist Party of Bangladesh (CPB). He was elected the first Member of Parliament from the Communist Party of Bangladesh in Sunamganj-1 seat in the 1991 Jatiya Sangsad. He joined the Bangladesh Nationalist Party on 15 October 1993. Later, for the second time in February 1996 and for the third time on the 2001 the Bangladesh Nationalist Party was elected to the same seat. He was defeated in the June 1996 election.

Was a member of the Bangladesh Nationalist Party 's Central Executive Committee. For 10 years Sunamganj was the BNP's general secretary. He served as the president of the district BNP for five years. During the tenure of the BNP government, he served as the chairman of the Standing Committee on the Ministry of Expatriates' Welfare of 2001.

He was defeated as an independent candidate from the two seats of Sunamganj-4 and Sunamganj-1 in the national election of 2008. He was defeated as a candidate of Bangladesh Nationalist Party from Sunamganj-1 in the 2018 national election.

See also 
 1991 Bangladeshi general election
 2001 Bangladeshi general election

References

External links 
 List of 5th Parliament Members  - Jatiya Sangsad
 List of 6th Parliament Members  - Jatiya Sangsad
 List of 8th Parliament Members  - Jatiya Sangsad

Bangladeshi politicians
People from Sunamganj District
Communist Party of Bangladesh politicians
Bangladesh Nationalist Party politicians
5th Jatiya Sangsad members
6th Jatiya Sangsad members
8th Jatiya Sangsad members